Tracy Ann Austin Holt (born December 12, 1962) is an American former world No. 1 tennis player. She won three Grand Slam titles: the women's singles titles at the 1979 and 1981 US Opens, and the mixed doubles title at the 1980 Wimbledon Championships. Additionally, she won the WTA Tour Championships in 1980 and the year-ending Toyota Championships in 1981, both in singles.

Austin remains the youngest US Open female singles champion (age 16) and the youngest inductee into the International Tennis Hall of Fame at age 29. She won thirty singles titles during her career, on all playing surfaces: clay (both red and green), indoor carpet, grass, and hard courts. A series of injuries and a serious automobile accident in 1989 cut short her career.

Playing style
Austin possessed a solid baseline game, with a strong flat-hit forehand and reliable two-handed backhand. Her favorite shot was the backhand down the line and she considered her backhand to be more powerful and accurate than her forehand.

She had excellent court coverage and struck the ball deep, with substantial pace, and with pinpoint accuracy.   

Austin's first serve was a mid-paced high percentage shot that functioned well on all playing surfaces, and although her second serve has been described as lacking penetration, she rarely double faulted.

Career

1977 to 1980
In January 1977, a month after turning fourteen, Austin won her first professional singles title, defeating Stacy Margolin at the Avon Futures event in Portland. As an amateur she could not accept the prize money. At her Wimbledon debut in 1977 she reached the third round where she lost to top-seeded Chris Evert. In September, she made her US Open debut and reached the quarterfinal, falling to fifth-seeded Betty Stöve.

Less than two months before her sixteenth birthday, Austin turned professional in October 1978. That same month, she won her first professional singles title, defeating Betty Stöve in the final of the Porsche Tennis Grand Prix in Filderstadt, West Germany. 

She followed up with tournament wins in Tokyo and Washington, defeating Martina Navratilova in both finals. Austin defeated 35-year-old Billie Jean King in the quarterfinals of the 1979 Wimbledon Championships, then lost to Navratilova in straight sets in the semifinals. Austin then became the youngest ever US Open champion, aged 16 years and 9 months, by defeating second-seeded Navratilova in the semifinals and first-seeded Chris Evert in the final. Evert had been attempting to win the title for the fifth consecutive year. Earlier that year, Austin ended Evert's 125-match winning streak on clay by beating her in three sets in a semifinal of the Italian Open. 

The Associated Press named Austin its Female Athlete of the Year for 1979.

Austin lost in the semifinals of both Grand Slam tournaments she played in 1980. Evonne Goolagong Cawley, seeded fourth and the eventual champion, defeated Austin at the Wimbledon Championships. As the top seed and defending champion at the US Open, Austin was expected to extend her five-match winning streak against third-ranked Evert. Austin took a 4–0 lead in the first set before Evert won 16 of the final 20 games to win the match. Evert went on to beat Hana Mandlíková in the final. Austin was ranked the world No. 1 singles player in 1980 for two weeks (April 7–20) and then for 19 weeks (July 7-November 17), partly because she captured the two tour-ending events. Austin defeated Navratilova to win the Avon Championships in March and Andrea Jaeger to capture the 1980 Colgate Series Championships in January 1981. In 1980, Austin won the Wimbledon mixed doubles title with her brother John, becoming the first brother and sister team to win a Grand Slam title together.

1981 to 1983
During the first four months of 1981, Austin played only two events because of chronic injuries. On grass, she defended her singles title at the Eastbourne International in the United Kingdom in June without losing a set. After Wimbledon, Austin won 26 consecutive matches and four consecutive tournaments. She defeated Pam Shriver in the final of the Wells Fargo Open in San Diego, and three weeks later, she beat both Navratilova and Evert in straight sets to win the Canadian Open in Toronto. As the third-seeded player at the US Open, Austin defeated fourth-seeded Navratilova in a three-set final. Navratilova, however, ended Austin's winning streak in the final of the U.S. Indoor Championships. In Europe during the autumn, Austin lost to Sue Barker in the quarterfinals of the Brighton International in Brighton, United Kingdom, but recovered the following week to defeat Navratilova in the final of the Porsche Tennis Grand Prix in Stuttgart, West Germany. At the final Grand Slam tournament of the year, Austin was seeded second but lost to sixth-seeded Shriver in the Australian Open quarterfinals. The 1981 year-ending Toyota Series Championships featured two matches against Evert and one against Navratilova. Evert won her round-robin match with Austin, then Austin defeated Evert in their semifinal. Austin won the tournament with a three-set defeat of Navratilova. The Associated Press named Austin its 1981 Female Athlete of the Year for the second time.

Austin was the first opponent of Steffi Graf when the German made her professional debut at the 1982 Porsche Tennis Grand Prix in Stuttgart. Austin defeated the 13-year-old Graf 6–4, 6–0.

Back injuries and recurring sciatica then began to impair Austin's effectiveness and sidelined her for long stretches. Billie Jean King, seeded twelfth, upset third-seeded Austin in the 1982 Wimbledon quarterfinals. Several weeks later, however, Austin won her 30th and final top-level singles title in San Diego. Austin had a good showing at the 1982 season-ending Toyota Series Championships where she defeated Jaeger, the world No. 3, in straight sets to reach the semifinals. However, she was unable to repeat 1981's victory over Evert, who defeated her in the semifinals.

In 1983, she was the runner-up at the Family Circle Cup, losing the final to Navratilova in three sets. She also reached the quarterfinals of the French Open.

1984 to 1989
Austin played sporadically from 1984 to 1987 and tried yet another comeback on the tour in 1988 when she played in seven doubles tournaments, and in 1989, when she played in one doubles and two singles tournaments. A highlight of this comeback included a semifinal showing in the 1988 US Open mixed doubles with partner Ken Flach. This comeback was ended by a near-fatal motor vehicle accident in Millburn, New Jersey, on August 3, 1989. A van coming from the opposite direction crashed into her vehicle's driver side, and she suffered a bruised heart, a bruised spleen, a sprained back and a shattered knee.

1992 to 1994
In 1992, Austin became the youngest person to be inducted into the International Tennis Hall of Fame, at the age of 29. She attempted a second comeback in 1993 and 1994 but was not particularly successful. In 1993, Austin upset Rennae Stubbs and Katerina Maleeva at the Evert Cup in Indian Wells, California, then lost to Stephanie Rottier. At the WTA Manhattan Beach event, she upset Gigi Fernández and Elena Likhovtseva, then lost to Gabriela Sabatini in the round of 16.  Her wins over Maleeva, Fernandez, and Likhovtseva began a buzz that Austin might become at least a top 20 player again. However, in 1994, her results were not as promising and at the Evert Cup in Indian Wells, California, Austin lost in the second round to Steffi Graf, and Austin soon retired in June 1994.

Family life and work as a tennis commentator
Austin's older sister Pam and her brothers Jeff, Doug and John were professional tennis players. She is the sister-in-law of fitness author Denise Austin, who is married to Jeff. She is married to Scott Holt and is the mother of three sons: Sean, Brandon, and Dylan. Brandon is also a professional tennis player and was previously a member of the USC Tennis team, recruited by Coach Peter Smith.

As a child, Austin lived next door to Air Force Colonel Keith Lindell, who was responsible for the training of the original seven Project Mercury astronauts.

Since retiring as a player, Austin has worked as a commentator for NBC and the USA Network for the French Open and the US Open. During the 2000s, she worked for the Seven Network, which broadcast the Australian Open and usually participates in the BBC's Wimbledon coverage. She began working for the Tennis Channel in 2010 and joined its US Open team and later its Australian Open team in 2012. Austin has worked for Canadian television for its coverage of the Rogers Cup since 2004.

Austin is the focus of David Foster Wallace's "How Tracy Austin Broke My Heart" (1992), a book review of Austin's ghostwritten memoir Beyond Center Court, lacerating the work for using generic, bland clichés of sports autobiographies to hide the genuinely compelling and tragic story of Austin's career.

Major finals

Grand Slam finals

Singles: 2 (2 titles)

Mixed doubles: 2 (1 title, 1 runner–up)

Year-end championships finals

Singles: 2 (1 title, 1 runner–up)

WTA career finals

Singles: 44 (30–14)

Doubles: 7 (5–2)

Grand Slam singles tournament timeline

Note: The Australian Open was held twice in 1977, in January and December.

See also
 List of female tennis players
 List of Grand Slam women's singles champions
 Performance timelines for all female tennis players who reached at least one Grand Slam final

References

External links

 
 
 
 

1962 births
Living people
American female tennis players
American television hosts
International Tennis Hall of Fame inductees
Sportspeople from Los Angeles County, California
People from Rolling Hills, California
Tennis commentators
Tennis people from California
US Open (tennis) champions
Wimbledon junior champions
Grand Slam (tennis) champions in women's singles
Grand Slam (tennis) champions in mixed doubles
Grand Slam (tennis) champions in girls' singles
American women television presenters
21st-century American women
WTA number 1 ranked singles tennis players